Highway 196 (AR 196, Ark. 196, and Hwy. 196) is an east–west state highway in Miller County in the Texarkana metropolitan area.

Route description
AR 196 begins at an intersection with US 71 in the College Hill area of Texarkana. The highway travels in an eastern direction along Division Street through a residential area before running through an industrial area near Tennessee Road. Highway 196 has a junction with Interstate 49 and travels through less developed areas, intersecting AR 237 in the Greenwich Village area of Texarkana. East of Greenwich Village, the route starts to travel in a southeast direction out of the city, passes the Creekwood subdivision, then turns south at an intersection with County Road 70. AR 196 turns back in an eastern direction near County Road 422 and travels through the Genoa area before ending at an intersection with AR 134 near Garland City.

Junction list

History
The route was created by the Arkansas State Highway Commission on June 23, 1965. It began at Forest Avenue in Texarkana and ran east of Genoa. This erroneous description was rescinded on September 29, 1965, and the western terminus was modified to the current alignment. Highway 196 was extended east to Garland City on November 23, 1966.

See also

References

196
Transportation in Miller County, Arkansas